Rountree Township (T10N R3W) is located in Montgomery County, Illinois, United States. As of the 2010 census, its population was 240 and it contained 111 housing units.

Geography

Demographics

Adjacent townships
 Ricks Township, Christian County (north)
 Greenwood Township, Christian County (northeast)
 Nokomis Township (east)
 Witt Township (southeast)
 Irving Township (south)
 Butler Grove Township (southwest)
 Raymond Township (west)
 King Township, Christian County (northwest)

References

External links
City-data.com
Illinois State Archives
Historical Society of Montgomery County

Townships in Montgomery County, Illinois
Townships in Illinois